"Yes I Am" is the debut single by Australian recording artist Jack Vidgen, taken from his debut studio album of the same name. Vidgen co-wrote the song with former Australian Idol vocal coach Erana Clark and producer A2. It was released for digital download 3 August 2011, as Vidgen's debut single, and peaked at number thirty-five on the ARIA Singles Chart.

Charts

References 

2011 singles
2011 songs